US Post Office—Niagara Falls Main is a historic post office building located at Niagara Falls in Niagara County, New York. It was built in 1906, and is one of a number of post offices in New York State designed by the Office of the Supervising Architect of the Treasury Department, James Knox Taylor.  The two story building is constructed of white Vermont marble on a granite base in a French Neoclassical style with Beaux-Arts details.

It was listed on the National Register of Historic Places in 1989.

References

External links

US Post Office-Niagara Falls Main - U.S. National Register of Historic Places on Waymarking.com

Niagara Falls
Niagara Falls
Government buildings completed in 1904
Buildings and structures in Niagara Falls, New York
National Register of Historic Places in Niagara County, New York